Nongan or Nong'an may refer to:

Nong'an County, Jilin, China
Nong'an Town, seat of Nong'an County
Nongan (kenong), contents of kenong, an instrument used in the Indonesian gamelan